The 1931 All-Pro Team consisted of American football players chosen by various selectors for the All-Pro team of the National Football League (NFL) for the 1931 NFL season. Teams were selected by, among others, the Green Bay Press-Gazette based on the returns of ballots sent to each club in the league as well as sports writers and officials, the United Press (UP), and Collyer's Eye (CE).

Players displayed in bold were consensus first-team selections. Four players were unanimously selected for the first team by all three selectors: Portsmouth Spartans quarterback Dutch Clark; Chicago Bears halfback Red Grange; Chicago Cardinals fullback Ernie Nevers; and New York Giants guard Butch Gibson.

Team

References

All-Pro Teams
1931 National Football League season